The Carlette was a British  cyclecar made in 1913 by the Holstein Garage of Weybridge, Surrey.

The car was powered by an 8 hp JAP V-twin engine. This was coupled to a countershaft by a rubber belt. Different "gear" ratios were available by moving the position of the belt with final drive by a further belt to the right hand rear wheel.

See also
 List of car manufacturers of the United Kingdom

References 

Cyclecars
Defunct motor vehicle manufacturers of England
Borough of Elmbridge
Defunct companies based in Surrey